Fingerpointing may refer to:

 an idiom for blame
 Fingerpointing (album), a 2008 album by Red Krayola